The 2014 United States Senate election in Idaho was held on November 4, 2014 to elect a member of the United States Senate to represent the State of Idaho, concurrently with the election of the Governor of Idaho, other elections to the United States Senate, elections to the United States House of Representatives, and various state and local elections.

Incumbent Republican Senator Jim Risch ran for re-election to a second term in office. In primary elections held on May 20, 2014, Risch was renominated and the Democrats nominated attorney Nels Mitchell. Risch defeated Mitchell by a landslide in the general election.

Republican primary

Candidates

Declared 
 Jeremy Anderson
 Jim Risch, incumbent U.S. Senator

Results

Democratic primary

Candidates

Declared 
 William Bryk, attorney from New York and perennial candidate
 Nels Mitchell, attorney

Results

General election

Fundraising

Debates 
 Complete video of debate, October 6, 2014

Predictions

Polling

Results

See also 
 2014 United States Senate elections
 2014 United States elections
 2014 United States House of Representatives elections in Idaho
 2014 Idaho gubernatorial election

References

External links 
 U.S. Senate elections in Idaho, 2014 at Ballotpedia
 Campaign contributions at OpenSecrets

2014
Idaho
2014 Idaho elections